The Bras Nord-Ouest (English: North-West Branch) is a tributary of the north shore of lac la Retenue, on the north shore of the St. Lawrence River. It flows in the municipality of L'Ange-Gardien, in the regional county municipality (MRC) of La Côte-de-Beaupré Regional County Municipality, in the administrative region of Capitale-Nationale, in the province of Quebec, in Canada.

The lower part of this valley (north of Lac la Retenue) is served by de la Vallée, des Montagnes and de la Rivière streets.

The surface of the Northwest Arm is generally frozen from the beginning of December until the end of March; however, safe traffic on the ice is generally from mid-December to mid-March. The water level of the river varies with the seasons and the precipitation; the spring flood occurs in March or April.

Geography 
The North-West Arm takes its source from a small forest lake. This source is located in a cuvée between mountain peaks (altitude: 500 m to the south and 634 m to the southwest) in the municipality of Château-Richer, at:
  east of a curve of the Montmorency River;
  north of the confluence of the Bras Nord-Ouest and Lac la Retenue;
  north-west of the north-west bank of the St. Lawrence River.

  south-west in a deep valley and crossing a small lake, then curving south at the end of the segment, until the outlet (coming from the west) of a small lake;
  towards the south-east down the mountain in a deep valley, to a bend of the river corresponding to the discharge (coming from the south-west) of a stream;
  first towards the east first in the forest zone, then agricultural, bending towards the south to collect the discharge (coming from the east) of a small lake, and crossing a small lake, then bending west at the end of the segment, to its mouth.

The North-West Arm flows into a forest islet at the bottom of a bay on the north shore] of Lac la Retenue which is crossed to the south-east by the Ferrée River.

Toponymy 
The toponym "Bras Nord-Ouest" was formalized on March 6, 1975, at the Commission de toponymie du Québec.

Notes and references

Appendices 
 La Côte-de-Beaupré Regional County Municipality
 L'Ange-Gardien, a municipality
 Lac la Retenue
 Rivière du Petit Pré
 Rivière la Retenue
 Ferrée River
 Montmorency River
 List of rivers of Quebec

Bibliography

External links 

Rivers of Capitale-Nationale
La Côte-de-Beaupré Regional County Municipality